Andrew Goldman (born November 21, 1965) is an American sailor. He competed in the Flying Dutchman event at the 1988 Summer Olympics.

References

External links
 

1965 births
Living people
American male sailors (sport)
Olympic sailors of the United States
Sailors at the 1988 Summer Olympics – Flying Dutchman
Sportspeople from New York City